Kevin O'Connell may refer to:
 Kevin O'Connell (American football) (born 1985), American football player and coach
 Kevin O'Connell (chess player) (born 1949), Irish chess master
 Kevin O'Connell (racing driver) (born 1967), American stock car racing driver
 Kevin O'Connell (sound mixer), (born 1957), American sound re-recording mixer
 Kevin O'Connell (American TV personality), (born 1948), American weather anchor